Malomykolaivka is an urban-type settlement in Rovenky Raion in Luhansk Oblast of eastern Ukraine. Population:

Demographics
Native language distribution as of the Ukrainian Census of 2001:
 Ukrainian: 41.84%
 Russian: 56.77%
 Others 1.39%

References

Urban-type settlements in Rovenky Raion